The Proximus Towers (known as the Belgacom Towers before the company's name change) are twin skyscrapers on the / in the Northern Quarter central business district of Brussels, Belgium. The buildings take their name from the telecommunications company Proximus. They are among the tallest buildings in Belgium.

The two towers are linked by a  glass skyway between the 25th and 26th floors of each building.

The towers were originally conceived as part of an eight-building Brussels World Trade Center complex, but were splintered off into a separate project. The construction of the towers began in 1991 and was completed in 1994.

See also

 Astro Tower
 Finance Tower
 Madou Plaza Tower
 North Galaxy Towers
 Rogier Tower
 World Trade Center (Brussels)

References

Buildings and structures in Brussels
Skyscraper office buildings in Belgium
Schaerbeek
Office buildings completed in 1996
Twin towers